Golden Bay may refer to:

 Golden Bay / Mohua, a bay at the northern end of New Zealand's South Island
 Golden Bay (Malta), a bay and beach on the coastline of Malta
 Golden Bay High School, a high school in Takaka, New Zealand
 Golden Bay, Western Australia, a suburb in Perth, Western Australia